Galax  is an independent city in the southwestern part of the Commonwealth of Virginia. As of the 2020 census, the population was 6,720.

The Bureau of Economic Analysis combines the city of Galax with neighboring Carroll County for statistical purposes. Galax is bounded to the northeast by Carroll County and to the southwest by Grayson County.

History

The area that later became Galax was part of an  land grant given to James Buchanan in 1756 by the British Crown. The first plat map for Galax is dated December 1903; The town founders selected the site for the city on a wide expanse of meadowland bisected by Chestnut Creek and sitting at an altitude of 2,500 feet on a plateau. The Virginia General Assembly officially chartered the town of Galax in 1906.

The town is named for Galax urceolata, an evergreen groundcover plant found throughout the Blue Ridge Mountains.  At the time, the plant was gathered and sold by many people in southwestern Virginia and northwestern North Carolina as an ornamental plant; a Norfolk and Western Railway Company official suggested that the town be named for the plant. The first Galax Agricultural Fair took place in September 1908, when Galax had 600 residents.

In the past, Galax was an industrial town; by the 1960s, Galax was home to six furniture factories, a mirror factory, at least four textile companies, two large department stores, a lumber company, Carnation Milk, Coca-Cola Bottling Company, and Clover Creamery.

The Town of Galax was separated from Carroll and Grayson counties and became an independent city on December 6, 1953.

In the 2000s, Galax and other small neighboring communities in southwestern Virginia joined with private businesses to create the Wired Road Authority, a public-private partnership that in 2009 created open-access, integrated regional broadband network with 100-megabit connections and in 2013 created gigabit connections. This was part of an economic-development effort.

The Old Grayson County Courthouse and Clerk's Office, Dr. Virgil Cox House, Gordon C. Felts House, Galax Commercial Historic District and A. G. Pless Jr. House are listed on the National Register of Historic Places.

Geography
Galax is located at  (36.664675, −80.920275).

The city is located 54.16 northwest of Winston-Salem, North Carolina and 68.69 miles southwest of Roanoke, Virginia.

Demographics

2020 census

Note: the US Census treats Hispanic/Latino as an ethnic category. This table excludes Latinos from the racial categories and assigns them to a separate category. Hispanics/Latinos can be of any race.

2000 Census
As of the census of 2000, there were 6,837 people, 2,950 households, and 1,843 families residing in the city.  The population density was 830.9 people per square mile (320.8/km2).  There were 3,217 housing units at an average density of 391.0 per square mile (150.9/km2).  The racial makeup of the city was 86.11% White, 6.26% Black or African American, 0.45% Native American, 0.70% Asian, 0.01% Pacific Islander, 5.51% from other races, and 0.95% from two or more races.  Hispanic or Latino of any race were 11.07% of the population.

There were 2,950 households, out of which 27.6% had children under the age of 18 living with them, 46.0% were married couples living together, 12.7% had a female householder with no husband present, and 37.5% were non-families. 34.2% of all households were made up of individuals, and 14.9% had someone living alone who was 65 years of age or older.  The average household size was 2.27 and the average family size was 2.90.

In the city, the population was spread out, with 23.0% under the age of 18, 7.9% from 18 to 24, 26.4% from 25 to 44, 23.5% from 45 to 64, and 19.2% who were 65 years of age or older.  The median age was 40 years. For every 100 females, there were 90.6 males.  For every 100 females age 18 and over, there were 84.1 males.

The median income for a household in the city was $28,236, and the median income for a family was $36,832. Males had a median income of $24,013 versus $18,393 for females. The per capita income for the city was $17,447.  About 13.6% of families and 18.6% of the population were below the poverty line, including 26.8% of those under age 18 and 21.4% of those age 65 or over.

Economy

Galax has historically been a center of furniture manufacturing.  In 2014, the Vaughan-Bassett Furniture Co., which manufactures bedroom furniture, employed 700 people in Galax and was reported to be unusually successful in an era when many U.S. factories closed due to globalization. The company won $46 million in an anti-dumping case against China, which allowed the factory to keep running. In 2012, Vaughan-Bassett announced an $8 million expansion, including $4.5 million in new equipment and machinery upgrades and $1.5 million to purchase the old Webb Furniture Enterprises plant (which had closed in January 2006, eliminating 309 jobs).

Separate from the Vaughan-Bassett Furniture Co. was the Vaughan Furniture Co., which is a different business owned by the Bassett family. Established in 1923, the Vaughan Furniture Co. was a privately held company that at its peak owned five factories (two of them in Galax) and employed more than 1,800 workers. Beginning in 2002, imported furniture from Mexico and then China disrupted U.S. manufacturing, leading to the company's decline. In 2008, Vaughan Furniture Co. closed its last factory in Galax, laying off 275 employees. At the end of 2014, the company announced its impending closure after 91 years.

An economic analysis of southwestern Virginia cities and counties found that Galax had the highest increase in travel expenditures from 2004 to 2012, at 71.4%.  The report found that "Galax, a city once dominated by industry, has become a blossoming tourism destination thanks to downtown revitalization efforts, its traditional music and arts scene (Old Fiddlers Convention, Chestnut School of the Arts), and its proximity to the Blue Ridge Parkway and the New River."

The Crossroads Rural Entrepreneurial Institute opened in Galax in 2005.

Culture

Located in the Appalachian region of the United States, Galax is known as a center of traditional "old-time" music and musicians, as is Round Peak, North Carolina near Mount Airy, some 15 miles away on the other side of the ridge. Galax and the surrounding region are also known for traditional instrument-making; A distinctive style of Appalachian dulcimer is named for Galax.

The annual Old Fiddler's Convention, held in Galax since 1935, is a popular old-time and bluegrass music festival.

Recreation
The New River Trail State Park, a 57-mile state park following an abandoned railroad right-of-way, passes through the city of Galax and four nearby counties.  The park is used by hikers, horseback riders, fishermen, canoeists, boaters, and cyclists, and features two tunnels, three major bridges, almost 30 smaller bridges and trestles, and a historic shot tower.

Located four miles east of Galax, in neighboring Carroll County, is the Crooked Creek Wildlife Management Area, which encompasses  of gently rolling mountains, both forested and open.

The Blue Ridge Parkway is about seven miles from Galax via South Main Street and Highway 89 with the picturesque Mabry Mill located at milepost 176.2 about thirty-five miles away. The Blue Ridge Music Center featuring a concert center, mountain music museum and visitor center is at milepost 213.

Grayson Highlands State Park noted for scenic views, trail hiking including the Appalachian Trail, Mount Rogers (the highest peak in Virginia) and wild mountain ponies is about forty miles to the west near the Mount Rogers National Recreation Area.

Climate
Long-term temperature and precipitation records describe the city's climate as an oceanic climate (Cfb) with monthly averages ranging from 32.5° to 70.7 °F in January and July, respectively. The hardiness zone is 6b.

Education
Galax is served by the Galax City Public School Division.
 High School: Galax High School (serving grades 9 through 12)
 Middle School: Galax Middle School (serving grades 6 through 8)
 Elementary School: Galax Elementary School (serving prekindergarten through grade 5)

Notable people

 Kylene Barker, Miss America 1979
 Eddie Bond, singer and musician
 Nancy Melvina Caldwell, member of the Virginia House of Delegates
 Charles William Carrico Sr., member of the Senate of Virginia
 Bobby Dodd, College Football Hall of Fame as player and coach
 Charlie Higgins, old-time fiddle player
 Mary Holland, actress and comedian
 Penelope W. Kyle, president of Radford University 2005 to June 2016
 Bart Lundy, NCAA college basketball coach High Point University, Marquette University, Queens University of Charlotte
 Tom McKnight, professional golfer Champions Tour
 Charles B. Morris, Korean and Vietnam War Veteran, Congressional Medal of Honor, Sergeant Major, US Army
 Larry Richardson, American bluegrass and old-time banjoist and guitarist
 Betsy Rutherford, old-time country music singer and recording artist
 Jim Scott, Virginia state legislator
 Ernest Stoneman, early country music recording artist
 Jack Kenny Williams, 17th President of Texas A&M University
 Dori Freeman, singer and song writer

Politics

See also
 Mountain View, Arkansas, a city with similar music culture in the Ozark Mountains
 National Register of Historic Places in Galax, Virginia

References

External links
 City of Galax official website
 Galax Tourism
 Old Fiddler's Convention
 Grayson Carroll Galax VA Directory
 Galax Scrapbook
 

 
1906 establishments in Virginia
Cities in Virginia
Populated places established in 1906
Southwest Virginia